East Freedom is a census-designated place (CDP) in Freedom Township, Blair County, Pennsylvania, United States.  It is located near I-99 and is approximately four miles to the west of the borough of Roaring Spring.  As of the 2010 census, the population was 972 residents.

Demographics

References

Census-designated places in Blair County, Pennsylvania
Census-designated places in Pennsylvania